Raniero Cantalamessa  (born 22 July 1934) is an Italian Catholic cardinal and priest in the Order of Friars Minor Capuchin and a theologian. He has served as the Preacher to the Papal Household since 1980, under Pope John Paul II, Pope Benedict XVI and Pope Francis.

Cantalamessa is a proponent of the Catholic charismatic renewal. Pope Francis raised him to the rank of cardinal on 28 November 2020.

Biography

Early life and education
Raniero Cantalamessa was born in Colli del Tronto, Italy, on 22 July 1934. He was ordained as a priest in the Franciscan Capuchin order in 1958. He holds doctoral degrees in theology and classical literature. He formerly served as a professor of ancient Christian history and the director of the Department of Religious Sciences at the Università Cattolica del Sacro Cuore in Milan, resigning in 1979. Cantalamessa also served as a member of the International Theological Commission from 1975 until 1981.

Preacher to the Papal Household
Cantalamessa was appointed the Preacher to the Papal Household by Pope John Paul II in 1980 and has been confirmed in this position by Popes Benedict XVI and Francis. In this capacity, he provides meditations to the Pope and other high-ranking officials each Friday during Lent and Advent, and is "the only person allowed to preach to the Pope."

Cantalamessa, a frequent speaker, is a member of the Catholic Delegation for the Dialogue with the Pentecostal Churches. He currently hosts a weekly program on Radiotelevisione Italiana.

Pope Francis, who had hoped to make a visit in person, and the bishops of the United States (through the United States Conference of Catholic Bishops and its president, Cardinal Daniel DiNardo, of the Galveston-Houston Archdiocese), had chosen Cantalamessa as the preacher, homilist, and spiritual director for their retreat, at Mundelein Seminary to deal with the 2017–2019 sex abuse and concealment crisis in the US Catholic Church. This gathering took place in advance of a February 2019 meeting of the presidencies of all the world's Catholic episcopal conferences with Pope Francis at the Vatican about the abuse crisis and cover-up worldwide, after which the US and other conferences will revise and establish new guidelines, statutes, and commissions for dealing with the crisis, especially as it pertains to abuses and concealments by bishops themselves.

Cardinalate
On 25 October 2020, Pope Francis announced he would raise him to the rank of cardinal at a consistory scheduled for 28 November 2020. On his demand, the pope granted Cantalamessa dispensation from the requirement that he be consecrated a bishop. At that consistory, Pope Francis made him Cardinal-Deacon of Sant'Apollinare alle Terme Neroniane-Alessandrine.

Aged more than 80 at the time of his elevation to the cardinalate, Cantalamessa is not a cardinal elector. Before the 2005 and 2013 papal conclaves, he was requested by the Holy College of Cardinals to the take one of the two public exhortations that introduce any conclave.

Notable statements

In 1988, Cantalamessa, in his book The Mystery of Christmas (Sydney: St. Paul's Publications, 1988) made a statement on Jewish–Christian relations, acknowledging that the church must reassess its identity based upon its Jewish roots: "Quite a few in the Jewish religion have started to acknowledge Jesus as 'the glory of Israel.' They openly acknowledge Jesus as the Messiah and call themselves 'Messianic Jews.' ... These help us to overcome certain gloomy prospects of ours, making us realize that the great original schism afflicting the Church and impoverishing it is not so much the schism between East and West or between Catholics and Protestants, as the more radical one between the Church and Israel." He then wrote: "We are not saying this in a spirit of proselytism but in a spirit of conversion and obedience to the Word of God because it is certain that the rejoining of Israel with the Church will involve a rearrangement in the Church; it will mean a conversion on both sides.  It will also be a rejoining of the Church with Israel." (101)

In December 2006, Cantalamessa urged Pope Benedict in an Advent sermon to declare a day of fasting and penitence in response to child sex crimes by clergy in the Roman Catholic Church.  There was no reported reaction from the Pope.

In 2010, Cantalamessa caused controversy with his sermon during Good Friday prayers in St Peter's Basilica. According to media outlets, he implied that the sensational coverage of alleged child abuse and cover-ups within the Roman Catholic Church was evidence of anti-Catholicism, and bore similarities to the "more shameful aspects of anti-Semitism". Cantalamessa responded that he was reading directly from a letter received earlier in the week from a Jewish friend; the unidentified letter writer was expressing his contempt for what he considered a blatant media assault on the Pope. A Vatican spokesman, Federico Lombardi, later gave a statement saying that Cantalamessa was not speaking as a Vatican official. The statement added that Cantalamessa's comparison could "lead to misunderstandings and is not an official position of the Catholic Church".

On 29 March 2013, in a Good Friday homily delivered in St Peter's Basilica, Cantalamessa preached in favor of clearing away "the residue of past ceremonials, laws and disputes, now only debris." He then referred to Francis of Assisi as exemplifying the creative destroyer of ecclesial traditions:

Film
Cantalamessa is the primary subject of the award-winning documentary The Preacher to the Popes: Raniero Cantalamessa from CMAX Media and Awakening the Domestic Church. The film premiered in December 2021 in Norfolk, VA. As of January 14, 2022 the documentary has won 8 awards in 12 different festivals.

Writings
Cantalamessa is the author of several books on theological and spiritual topics. A selection follows:

See also
Cardinals created by Francis
Prefecture of the Papal Household

References

External links

 

1934 births
Living people
People from Ascoli Piceno
20th-century Italian Roman Catholic priests
20th-century Italian Roman Catholic theologians
Capuchins
Officials of the Roman Curia
Pentecostalism
International Theological Commission
Cardinals created by Pope Francis
21st-century Italian cardinals
Capuchin cardinals